The CCHA Forward of the Year is an annual award given out after the conclusion of the Central Collegiate Hockey Association regular season to the best forward in the conference as voted by the coaches of each CCHA team. The award was a new creation by the conference in its return to play.

Award winners

Winners by school

Winners by position

See also
CCHA Awards

References

General

Specific

External links

College ice hockey player of the year awards in the United States
Forward of the Year